Holtville is a Canadian community in the community of Upper Miramichi in Northumberland County, New Brunswick.

Notable people

See also
List of communities in New Brunswick

References

Communities in Northumberland County, New Brunswick